Vittorio Ambrosini (1893–1971) was an Italian politician, journalist, and a founding member of the Arditi, the Italian special forces unit in World War I.

References 

1893 births
1971 deaths
20th-century Italian people
20th-century Italian politicians
People from Favara, Sicily